K.G. Wodeyar was an Indian politician, elected to the Lok Sabha, the lower house of the Parliament of India as a member of the Indian National Congress.

References

External links
Official biographical sketch in Parliament of India website

1901 births
Year of death missing
India MPs 1952–1957
India MPs 1957–1962
Lok Sabha members from Karnataka
Indian National Congress politicians